The David Crabill House is a historic house in Moorefield Township, Ohio, built c. 1825–30 with Federal-style elements adapted to the frontier.

David Crabill and his wife were early settlers in the area, arriving in 1808.

References

National Register of Historic Places in Clark County, Ohio
Federal architecture in Ohio
Houses completed in 1830